, also  (ABA, old-Bachian archive), is a collection of 17th-century vocal music, most of which was written by members of the Bach family.

History
Johann Ambrosius Bach, Johann Sebastian's father, supposedly started to collect compositions by his relatives. Carl Philipp Emanuel Bach, Johann Sebastian's son and co-author of his obituary, retained the collection and gave it its name. After his death the largest part of the collection came, via , in the possession of the Sing-Akademie zu Berlin. All nine motets of the Sing-Akademie's part of the ABA collection, including BWV 1164, at the time attributed to Johann Christoph Bach, were published in the early 1820s.

The manuscripts of two compositions contained in the Sing-Akademie's part of the ABA collection were sold to the Royal Library in Berlin (later renamed as Berlin State Library): thus BNB I/B/11 and BWV 1164 were no longer in the Sing-Akademie's archives by the end of the 19th century. In 1935 Max Schneider, recovering ABA manuscripts scattered in the Sing-Akademie's archive, published a selection of these compositions, an edition which was reprinted in 1966. ABA numbers derive from this publication in two volumes. The original manuscripts of the Sing-Akademie's archive went lost during the Second World War, only to be rediscovered in Ukraine in 1999, after which they were returned to the Sing-Akademie, which in turn deposited the recovered manuscripts in the Berlin State Library for conservation.

Compositions

References

Sources
 
 Axel Fischer and Matthias Kornemann (editors). The Archive of the Sing-Akademie zu Berlin: Catalogue. De Gruyter, 2009. .
 Max Schneider (editor). Altbachisches Archiv: aus Johann Sebastian Bachs Sammlung von Werken seiner Vorfahren Johann, Heinrich, Georg Christoph, Johann Michael u. Johann Christoph Bach. (Das Erbe deutscher Musik, Series I). Breitkopf & Härtel, Leipzig 1935, reprint 1966.
 Vol. 1: Motetten und Chorlieder.
 Vol. 2: Kantaten.
 Patrice Veit. "ENßLIN, Wolfram, Die Bach-Quellen der SingAkademie zu Berlin. Katalog", recension in Revue de l'Institut français d'histoire en Allemagne, 2007.

External links
 Das Alt-Baschische Archiv – Performed by Konrad Jünghanel & Cantus Cölln at 

 
Vocal musical compositions
Motets
Cantatas
17th century in music